Liabøen or Liabø is a village in Heim Municipality in Trøndelag county, Norway. Liabøen has a bank, store, cafe, and school.

Prior to 2020, the village was the administrative centre of the old Halsa Municipality.

References

Heim, Norway
Villages in Trøndelag